Sense and Sensibility is a 1981 BBC television adaptation of Jane Austen's 1811 novel. The seven-part series was dramatized by Alexander Baron, and directed by Rodney Bennett. This telling of the tale omits the character of Margaret Dashwood, the younger sister of Elinor and Marianne. It has been remastered.

Cast 
 Irene Richard – Elinor Dashwood
 Tracey Childs – Marianne Dashwood
 Bosco Hogan – Edward Ferrars
 Robert Swann – Colonel Brandon
 Diana Fairfax – Mrs. Dashwood
 Donald Douglas – Sir John Middleton
 Annie Leon – Mrs. Jennings
 Peter Woodward – John Willoughby
 Marjorie Bland – Lady Middleton
 Peter Gale – John Dashwood
 Amanda Boxer – Fanny Dashwood
 Christopher Brown – Mr. Palmer
 Hetty Baynes – Charlotte Palmer
 Julia Chambers – Lucy Steele
 Pippa Sparkes – Ann Steele
 Philip Bowen – Robert Ferrars
 Margot Van der Burgh – Mrs. Ferrars

References

External links 

 
 
 

1981 British television series debuts
1981 British television series endings
BBC television dramas
Television series based on Sense and Sensibility
Television shows set in England
Costume drama television series
1980s British drama television series
1980s British romance television series
1980s British television miniseries
Television series set in the 19th century
English-language television shows
Works set in country houses